The Tomb of Baba Loghman in Sarakhs is the site of the Loghman Sorakhi burial. The building is thought to be the ceremonial tomb of Sufi mystic Babalqaman Sarakhsi. As well as a tall dome there are two brick enclosing walls and a long porch. On the body of each side, an opening allows natural light to illuminate the dome. There are important plasterwork embellishments and fine brickwork: interior arches are decorated with rhombic geometric patterns.

Overall the architecture is considered similar to the Tomb of Ahmed Sanjar.

Sources 

Mausoleums in Iran
National works of Iran
Tourist attractions in Razavi Khorasan Province